Kira Dixon (née Kazantsev; born July 20, 1991) is an American beauty pageant titleholder who won Miss America 2015 on September 14, 2014. She is the third consecutive Miss America winner from New York and had won the title of Miss New York on May 24, 2014 while serving as Miss City of New York.

Early life and education
Kazantsev was born on July 20, 1991 in San Francisco, California, to Russian immigrants who left Moscow in 1990 for the United States, making her a first-generation American. Her father, George, is a general surgeon and her mother, Julia (née Afrikian), is a real-estate broker. She has one brother named Boris, who is eight years younger. Kazantsev is trilingual, being fluent in English, Russian, and Spanish.

She graduated from Las Lomas High School in Walnut Creek, California and served as the student body president in 2009. She attended Hofstra University in Hempstead, New York with a triple major in political science, global studies, and geography. She joined the Alpha Phi sorority during her time at Hofstra, but was eventually removed from the sorority by the university due to concerns over hazing. During junior year at Hofstra University, she studied abroad in Barcelona, Spain. After graduating from Hofstra, Kazantsev applied to numerous law schools and was accepted to Notre Dame Law School and Fordham Law School. She stated in interviews, after being named Miss America 2015, her desire to specialize in international law upon receiving her J.D. degree.

In the summer of 2017, Kazantsev attended the Stanford Graduate School of Business completing the Stanford Ignite entrepreneurship program, which is a "suite of certificate programs that teaches innovators to formulate, develop, and commercialize their ideas."

Pageantry

Early pageantry
At age 13, she was named Miss California Preteen, and at age 16, she served as Miss California Jr.

Miss New York 2013
Kazantsev competed in the Miss New York 2013 pageant as Miss Cosmopolitan. She placed in the Top 10.

Miss New York 2014
The following year, Kazantsev competed in the Miss New York 2014 pageant as Miss City of New York. She won the title of Miss New York 2014 and was crowned by Miss New York 2013 Amanda Mason.

Miss America 2015

Kazantsev, representing New York, was one of the 52 delegates competing in the Miss America 2015 pageant held in Atlantic City, New Jersey in September 2014. Her platform was "Love Shouldn't Hurt": Protecting Women Against Domestic Violence; Kazantsev stated that her personal experience with domestic violence was the inspiration for choosing this platform.

For her talent she sang "Happy" by Pharrell Williams as she used a red plastic cup as a percussion, in a manner that was similar to Anna Kendrick's character in the movie Pitch Perfect and Kendrick's "Cups" music video.

During the on-stage question portion of the contest, she was asked what issue women in the senate need to put on the forefront. Kazantsev stated that she felt military sexual assault needed attention and resources of women in congress. She noted that she was happy that female politicians were already doing so, and proud to be a constituent of one of these women (Senator Kirsten Gillibrand).

She was crowned by outgoing Miss America 2014, Nina Davuluri, beating out first runner-up, Miss Virginia 2014, Courtney Garrett. She was the third consecutive Miss New York to earn the title of Miss America. Her win made New York the first state to have a Miss America winner three years in a row. Apart from the title, Kira won a $50,000 scholarship provided in part by Joseph Ribkoff Inc. and the Miss America Organization to continue her education, which she planned to use towards law school.

Hazing controversy
In September 2014, relying on unnamed sources, Jezebel published a piece stating that, while at Hofstra University, Kazantsev was expelled from the Alpha Phi sorority for hazing. On Good Morning America, Kazantsev admitted her involvement in activities that fit the "broad definition of hazing," but denied the allegations of abuse, describing the hazing at Alpha Phi as "menial tasks." In her personal blog, Kazantsev wrote that not attending national Alpha Phi's judiciary hearing of her case was the official reason for the termination.

Miss America role
As Miss America, Kazantsev served as the official National Goodwill Ambassador for Children's Miracle Network Hospitals. Additionally, to further promote her platform of "Love Shouldn't Hurt", Kazantsev teamed up with Safe Horizon to launch the #PutTheNailinIt campaign with the aim to "end domestic violence for good." The campaign aims to spread awareness of domestic violence by painting your ring fingernail purple.

On November 23, 2014, Kazantsev appeared as a presenter at the 42nd Annual American Music Awards in Nokia Theatre L.A. Live, in Los Angeles, California. On December 15, 2014, she appeared as a presenter at the American Country Countdown Awards in Nashville, Tennessee. She also presented at the Academy of Country Music Awards on April 19, 2015, at the AT&T Stadium in Arlington, Texas. On May 17, 2015, she appeared as a presenter with Pete Wentz at the 2015 Billboard Music Awards in the T-Mobile Arena in Las Vegas, Nevada.

Kazantsev was also the first Miss America in 35 years to travel with the United Service Organizations (USO) and visit troops abroad.

Career
She has had summer internships at a political consultancy in Washington, D.C., served as a volunteer for U.S. Senator Kirsten Gillibrand's 2012 re-election campaign, waited tables, interned at a local affiliate of Planned Parenthood, launched a food blog and served as a hostess.

Kazantsev is the Children's Miracle Network Hospitals' Director of Digital Channels and Community Engagement.

In November 2017 Kazantsev launched a podcast called "What We Do," in which every week she talks with women about, "the tough issues, the challenges we’ve faced, the best moments, the funny moments and the not so great moments."

In 2021 she joined Golf Channel as reporter on a number of events throughout PGA Tour season while also appears on Golf Today and Golf Central shows and becoming special contributors to GolfPass. Prior to that, she served as a GolfPass Lifestyle Correspondent.

Personal life
On September 4, 2018, Kazantsev announced her engagement to long-time boyfriend and Marine, Andrew Dixon. The couple married on September 21, 2019 in Alexander Valley, California.

References

External links
 Official website
 

1991 births
American people of Russian descent
American women podcasters
American podcasters
Living people
Hofstra University alumni
Miss America winners
Miss America 2015 delegates
Miss New York winners
People from San Francisco
People from Walnut Creek, California